Fleury may refer to:

People 
 Fleury (name), a given name or surname, including a list of people with the name
 De Fleury, a surname, including a list of people with the name
 Abraham-Joseph Bénard (1750–1822), known as Fleury, a French actor and comedian
 Mademoiselle Fleury (Marie-Anne-Florence Bernardy-Nones, 1766–1818), a Belgian actress in France

Places in France
 Fleury, Aisne
 Fleury, Aude
 Fleury, Manche
 Fleury, Moselle
 Fleury, Oise
 Fleury, Pas-de-Calais
 Fleury, Somme
 Fleury-devant-Douaumont, Meuse
 Fleury-en-Bière, Seine-et-Marne
 Fleury-la-Forêt, Eure
 Fleury-la-Montagne, Saône-et-Loire
 Fleury-la-Rivière, Marne
 Fleury-la-Vallée, Yonne
 Fleury-les-Aubrais, Loiret
 Fleury-Mérogis, Essonne
 Fleury-sur-Andelle, Eure
 Fleury-sur-Loire, Nièvre
 Fleury-sur-Orne, Calvados
 Fleury Abbey, in Saint-Benoît-sur-Loire, Loiret

See also

 Champfleury (disambiguation)
 Fleurey (disambiguation)
 Fleurie, a commune in France
 Fleury Playbook, a medieval collection of Latin biblical dramas
 Cross fleury, in heraldry